Seiriol John Arthur Evans, CBE (22 November 1894 – 29 June 1984) was an Anglican dean and author in the third quarter of the 20th century.Born into an ecclesiastical family, he was educated at King's College School, Cambridge, then The King's School, Worcester before returning to King's College, Cambridge as an undergraduate. He was then ordained after a period of study at Salisbury Theological College in 1921. He was Curate of St Mary and All Saints, Kidderminster then Sacrist of Gloucester Cathedral. After this he was Precentor of Ely Cathedral from 1923 to 1929 and then Rector of Upwell. During World War II he was a Chaplain in the RNVR. From 1945 to 1953 he was Archdeacon of Wisbech when he was appointed to the Gloucester Deanery- a post he held for 19 years. He spent his retirement in Fulbourn.
There is a stone effigy dedicated to him at Gloucester Cathedral

Notes

1894 births
People educated at King's School, Worcester
Alumni of King's College, Cambridge
Royal Naval Volunteer Reserve personnel of World War II
Archdeacons of Wisbech
Deans of Gloucester
Commanders of the Order of the British Empire
1984 deaths
Royal Navy chaplains
World War I chaplains
People from Fulbourn